Westport Lake is a lake and local nature reserve in Stoke-on-Trent, in Staffordshire, England, about  south of Tunstall. It is alongside the Trent and Mersey Canal.

It is owned by the Canal and River Trust, and is operated by the Staffordshire Wildlife Trust and Stoke-on-Trent City Council.

There is a visitor centre, with a café and lakeside balcony. The centre has conference facilities. Staffordshire Wildlife Trust has two visitor centres; the other is the Wolseley Centre near Rugeley.

The lake is the largest expanse of water in Stoke-on-Trent. There is a level footpath of about  around the lake. There is waterfowl on the lake, and it is an overwintering site for many species.

History
In the 1890s the lake was developed as a pleasure resort, but it later became a wasteland. It was an early landscape regeneration project of Stoke-on-Trent; it was opened in 1972 as a recreation and conservation area.

References

Tourist attractions in Stoke-on-Trent
Local nature reserves in Staffordshire
Lakes of Staffordshire
Visitor centres in England
Nature centres in England